Push   is a 2009 American superhero thriller film directed by Paul McGuigan and written by David Bourla. Starring Chris Evans, Dakota Fanning, Camilla Belle, and Djimon Hounsou, the film centers on people with superhuman abilities who band together to take down a government agency that is using a dangerous drug to enhance their powers in the hope of creating an army of super soldiers.

The film was released on February 6, 2009, by Summit Entertainment and Icon Productions. It was a moderate box office success, though critical reception was mostly negative.

Plot
From 1945 onwards, various countries began experimenting on people with psychic abilities, in an attempt to turn them into soldiers. Countries set up Divisions to track, categorize and experiment on psychics.

10 years in the past, two Movers, Jonah Gant and his young son Nick, are pursued by the U.S. Division. Jonah tells Nick that a woman told him that in the future, Nick must help a girl who gives him a flower. Division agent Henry Carver, a Pusher, leads a team that kills Jonah, but Nick escapes.

In the present, the U.S. Division has developed a drug that can boost psychic abilities, but all test subjects died until Pusher Kira Hudson successfully adapted to it. She steals a syringe of the drug before fleeing, unknowingly being helped in her escape by another woman in the facility. Carver orders the Division to capture Kira and retrieve the syringe.

Meanwhile, Nick has also moved to Hong Kong, a common hiding place for psychics. Nick's powers are blunted from rare usage, and he incurs debt when his powers fail to help him cheat in gambles. Division Sniffers Mack and Holden visit Nick, looking for Kira, but find no trace. Nick is visited immediately after by Cassie, a moody teenage Watcher, who also wants Nick to help find Kira. At a market, Nick and Cassie are confronted by a triad, who are also looking for Kira. The Triad Bleeders severely wound Nick, and Cassie calls in a favour from Stitch Teresa to heal Nick, who realises that Cassie is the girl that his father wanted him to help. Mack and Holden capture Kira in Hong Kong, but she escapes after influencing Mack to kill Holden. Carver dismisses Mack, but Mack insists on continuing, so Carver influences Mack to kill himself.

Nick and Cassie track down Kira with the assistance of Shifter Hook Waters and Sniffer Emily Wu. Finding Kira shocks Nick, because she is his ex-girlfriend, and no one searching for her had informed him of her identity. Kira has hidden the syringe and had Wiper Wo Chiang erase her memory of its location, protecting it from Division agents. Nick recruits Shadow Pinky Stein, to hide Kira from the Division. Nick and Kira reconcile and kiss. Nick tracks down Carver with Emily's assistance, and attempts an ambush. Carver reveals that Emily will eventually die without more of the drug, which only Carver has. Carver's right-hand man, Pusher Victor, defeats Nick. Cassie convinces Carver to spare Nick. Cassie finds a key in Kira's shoe which unlocks the locker containing the syringe.

To prevent Watchers from foreseeing his future moves, Nick creates several envelopes containing instructions for his allies, then has his own memory erased by Wo Chiang. Hook creates a temporary duplicate of the syringe, while Pinky delivers Kira to Carver as part of the plan. Teresa betrays Nick to the triad, passing Hook's duplicate syringe to them, before Nick defeats her. Carver influences Kira to believing that she was a Division agent and her relationship with Nick was a lie. Cassie is ambushed by the triad's Pop Girl, only for Wo Chiang to appear and erase Pop Girl's memory per Nick's instructions.

Nick visits Carver to trade the syringe for Kira, discovering Kira's brainwashing, and is restrained. Kira, Carver and Victor visit a construction site to retrieve the syringe, but the Triad ambushes them for it, causing a battle that kills many triad members and inadvertently frees Nick, who also joins the battle. Victor is killed by the triad leader, who is defeated by Nick. Nick seizes the syringe and Carver allows him to inject himself with it, apparently dying. After Kira and Carver leave, Cassie appears, revealing that Nick is alive as he used a syringe with a fake drug. They retrieve the real syringe and discuss using it to free Cassie's Watcher mother from the Division, whom Cassie states hatched the entire plan to take down the Division from before Cassie was born. 

Later, Kira discovers her unopened envelope, which contains a photograph proving her relationship with Nick was real, with an instruction to kill Carver. Kira influences Carver to shoot himself and a gunshot is heard.

Cast
 Chris Evans as Nick Gant, an untrained Mover hiding in Hong Kong from the Division.  As a child he witnessed his father being murdered by Agent Carver and has difficulty controlling his power.
 Colin Ford as young Nick

 Dakota Fanning as Cassie Holmes, a 13-year-old Watcher and the daughter of the most powerful Watcher the Division has encountered. Her abilities are not fully developed and she is sometimes confused by the premonitions she draws.
 Cassie's mother Sarah Frank (uncredited); a powerful Watcher imprisoned and drugged by the Division to prevent her using her powers against them.

 Camilla Belle as Kira Hudson/Hollis, a high-level Pusher escapee from the Division. The only Division patient to have survived experimentation.
 Djimon Hounsou as Division Agent Henry Carver, a powerful Pusher who killed Nick's father and is tasked to recapture Kira.
 Joel Gretsch as Jonah Gant, Nick's father. An advanced Mover killed for refusing to join the Division.
 Ming-Na Wen as Emily Wu, a Sniffer who helps Nick and Cassie find Kira.
 Cliff Curtis as Hook Waters, a former Division Shifter who believes the Division murdered his wife.
 Nate Mooney as Pinky Stein, a Shadow who hides Kira. He is missing his pinky finger.
 Corey Stoll as Sniffer Agent Mack.
 Scott Michael Campbell as Sniffer Agent Holden.
 Neil Jackson as Victor Budarin, an advanced Mover and Carver's right-hand man.
 Maggie Siff as Teresa Stowe, a Stitch who heals Nick.
 Paul Che as Wo Chiang, a Wiper living on a boat.
 Xiao Lu Li as Pop Girl, a Triad Watcher who draws her visions and tracks Nick and Cassie.
 Kwan Fung Chi and Jacky Heung as Pop Boys, Triad Bleeders.
 Haruhiko Yamanouchi as Pop Father, Triad Bleeder and father to the Pop siblings.

Reception

Box office
On its opening weekend, the film opened No. 6 grossing $10,079,109 in 2,313 theaters with a $4,358 average. The film grossed $48,858,618 worldwide, and $16,285,488 in DVD sales in the US alone making $65,157,106 (not including worldwide DVD sales) surpassing its budget cost of $38 million by over $27 million.

Critical response
The site's critical consensus reads, "The sci-fi thriller Push is visually flashy but hyperkinetic and convoluted." Metacritic, which assigns a weighted average to critic reviews, gave the film an average score of 36 out of 100, based on 21 critics. Roger Ebert of the Chicago Sun-Times gave the film one and a half stars out of four stating: ""Push" has vibrant cinematography and decent acting, but I'm blasted if I know what it's about." Robert Koehler of Variety called the film “a confused jumble of parts in search of a whole", and said it "plays like a mix-tape sample of scenes from Heroes, Fringe, Alias and The X-Files." Michael Rechtshaffen of The Hollywood Reporter said “While the concept of corralling assorted [Movers, Watchers, and Pushers] and placing them against a stylish Asian backdrop is intriguing, the picture seldom rises to the occasion.”

Tasha Robinson of The A.V. Club was more positive, giving it a B+: "Superhero fans will likely be into Push just for the cool-factor of watching embattled heroes and villains in a tense war of wits, wills, and skills. That broader audience is less likely to come along for the ride, but this particular gateway drug at least has ambition and brains going for it, as well as the usual spastic style."

Comic
Wildstorm, an imprint of DC Comics, published a comic book mini-series that acts as a prequel to the film. It was written by Marc Bernardin and Adam Freeman (who wrote The Highwaymen for Wildstorm) and Bruno Redondo supplied the art. Issues were published between January 2009 and February 2009, and a softcover collection was published in September 2009.

Home media
Push was released on DVD and Blu-ray on July 7, 2009. The DVD included deleted scenes, a commentary, and a 'making of' featurette. Wal-Mart released the film as a double-feature DVD with Knowing.  Push was released on 4K UHD Blu-Ray on April 10, 2018.

Soundtrack and score
No official soundtrack has been released, although the full score is available to stream online on the official Neil Davidge website.

See also 
 Stargate Project, the real U.S. Federal Government project to investigate psychic phenomena, used as a basis for the film.
 Firestarter, a 1984 film (based on the Stephen King novel of the same name) with a similar plot.
 Scanners, a 1981 film written and directed by David Cronenberg which also features characters with psychic abilities.

References

External links

 
 
 
 
 Push at ReelSoundtrack

2009 films
2009 action thriller films
2000s superhero films
American action thriller films
American science fiction action films
American superhero films
Films about amnesia
Films about mind control
Films directed by Paul McGuigan
Films produced by Bruce Davey
Films set in Hong Kong
Films shot in China
Films shot in Hong Kong
Fiction about memory erasure and alteration
Smart drugs in fiction
Films about telekinesis
Films adapted into comics
Icon Productions films
Summit Entertainment films
2000s English-language films
2000s American films